Magdalena Fręch (born 15 December 1997) is a Polish tennis player.

She has won one singles title on the WTA Challenger Tour. She has also won five singles titles and four doubles titles on the ITF Circuit. On 25 July 2022, she reached her best singles ranking of world No. 82. On 8 August 2022, she peaked at No. 174 in the WTA doubles rankings.

Playing for the Poland Billie Jean King Cup team, Fręch has a win–loss record of 9–3.

Professional career

2013: WTA Tour debut
Fręch made her WTA Tour debut at the Katowice Open, partnering Katarzyna Pyka in doubles.

2018: Grand Slam debut
Fręch started 2018 season in Auckland where she lost in qualifying (in the first round) to Sachia Vickery, in straight sets. She then took part at the first Grand Slam qualifying in her career - at the Australian Open. She beat Miyu Kato, Sofya Zhuk and Kayla Day, and became one of the 12 qualifiers, making her main-draw debut at the Grand Slam championship. In the first round, she lost to eventual quarterfinalist Carla Suárez Navarro, in straight sets. At the end of January, Fręch played at the $60k Andrézieux-Bouthéon event where she defeated Conny Perrin in three sets, Chloé Paquet in two and Vitalia Diatchenko (6–3, 2–2 ret.). In the semifinals, she lost to eventual champion Georgina García Pérez, in three sets. In February, she started at the Hungarian Open where she came through the qualifying competition by defeating Çağla Büyükakçay in three, and Anna Blinkova in straight sets.

2021–23: WTA 1000 & top 100 debuts, Major third round
She made her top 100 debut at No. 99 on 18 October 2021 following her qualification at the 2021 BNP Paribas Open and first round win over Saisai Zheng. She lost to top seed Karolina Pliskova.

She qualified again for the 2022 BNP Paribas Open into the main draw entering as a lucky loser and won against Mayar Sherif before losing to 30th seed Marketa Vondrousova.  She reached the third of a Major for the first time in her career at Wimbledon.

She again entered the 2023 BNP Paribas Open as a lucky loser for a second consecutive year, and won her third match at this tournament defeating Maryna Zanevska before losing to fourth seed Ons Jabeur.

National representation
In 2016, Fręch made her debut at the Fed Cup, playing for Poland. Her first match was in a World Group II Play-off where Poland played against Chinese Taipei. Frech was chosen to play her first match against Lee Ya-hsuan, where she also made her first Fed Cup win. In the next match, Frech lost against Hsu Ching-wen.

In 2018, from 7 to 10 February, she played at Fed Cup in Tallinn where she lost to Melanie Klaffner (Austria) in straight sets, Anastasija Sevastova (Latvia) in straight sets, and she defeated Ayla Aksu (Turkey) and Isabella Shinikova (Bulgaria) - both in straight sets.

Performance timeline

Only main-draw results in WTA Tour, Grand Slam tournaments, Fed Cup/Billie Jean King Cup and Olympic Games are included in win–loss records.

Singles
Current after the 2023 ATX Open.

Doubles

WTA 125 tournament finals

Singles: 1 (title)

ITF Circuit finals

Singles: 8 (5 titles, 3 runner–ups)

Doubles: 8 (4 titles, 4 runner–ups)

Head-to-head records

Record vs. top 10-ranked players and players who have been in top 10

Fręch's record against players who have been ranked in the top 10. Active players are in boldface.

Notes

References

External links

 
 
 
  

1997 births
Living people
Sportspeople from Łódź
Polish female tennis players
21st-century Polish women